Ibrahim Hassan Kheite (1930–1984), also known as Ibrahim Ghannam, was a Palestinian artist in Lebanon.

Biography

Ghannam contracted Gout as a child and used a wheelchair throughout his life. He painted scenes of village life in a naïve style using bright colours.

Ghannam is the subject of Adnan Mdanat's 1977 documentary film Palestinian Visions.

He said in an interview: "I feel that my life stopped at the age of 17, because that is how old I was when I left, and I only live when I dream of those days."

See also
Palestinian art

References

Sources 
Palestine Foundation for Culture  (in Arabic)

1930 births
1984 deaths
Artists from Beirut
Contemporary painters
Palestinian painters
Palestinian artists
Lebanese artists
Lebanese illustrators
Palestinian illustrators